Sophie Rammal Alakija ( Rammal) is an actress in Nigerian cinema.

Personal life
Alakija was born on 8 February to an Islamic family who are of Efik and Lebanese descent. She was married to Wale Alakija and gave birth to  two children

She loves being on her natural hair even on set.

Career
Alakija featured in the Holla at your boy music video of her ex-boyfriend Wizkid as the lead dancer in the year 2010.

She has acted in several films, including Drawing Strands, Getting over him, and Small Chops. In 2017, she acted in the TV series Scandals, which is a collaboration between Ghana and Nigeria. In 2019, she acted in the TV series Halita and then in the TV series Assistant Madams. She also starred in Timini Egbuson's Muslim wife in 2020. Also, recently in the movie My village people in 2021.

Filmography

References

External links
 

Living people
People from Lagos
Year of birth missing (living people)
21st-century Nigerian actresses
Nigerian film actresses
Nigerian television actresses
Residents of Lagos